Western clematis is a common name for several plants and may refer to:

Clematis ligusticifolia, native to western North America
Clematis pubescens, native to western Australia